WMCI may refer to:

 Walter Murray Collegiate Institute
 Wyoming Medium Correctional Institution
 WMCI (FM), a radio station (101.3 FM) licensed to serve Mattoon, Illinois, United States